Joy Goeben is an American teacher, business owner, and politician from the U.S. state of Wisconsin.  A Republican, she is a member of the Wisconsin State Assembly representing Wisconsin's 5th Assembly district since January 2023.

Biography
Joy Goeben was born in Wisconsin and lived most of her life in the Green Bay area.  She graduated from Green Bay East High School and then earned her bachelor's degree in education from the University of Wisconsin–Green Bay, and completed her master's in education at Walden University.

She then went to work as a teacher in the Ashwaubenon, Wisconsin, public school system.  Later, she opened the Joyful Hearts Family Childcare preschool center, which she operated for ten years.  She also assists her husband in the management of their family business, Classic Carpet Cleaning.  She is a member of the board of Christ Alone Church Leadership, and has also been a member of the board of the non-profit Green Bay Area Christian Homeschoolers.

Political career
In the Summer of 2022, Wisconsin State Assembly incumbent Jim Steineke resigned from office, leaving a vacancy in the 5th Assembly district.  Goeben decided to enter the race for the Republican nomination, and defeated two opponents in the August 2022 Republican primary.  She went on to win the Fall general election, receiving 60% of the vote.

Personal life and family
Goeben and her husband, Ben, reside in Hobart, Wisconsin.  They have four children, their eldest son is an officer in the United States Army.

Electoral history

Wisconsin Assembly (2022)

| colspan="6" style="text-align:center;background-color: #e9e9e9;"| Republican Primary, August 9, 2022

| colspan="6" style="text-align:center;background-color: #e9e9e9;"| General Election, November 8, 2022

References

External links
 Campaign website
 Joy Goeben at Wisconsin Vote

Living people
Year of birth missing (living people)
People from Brown County, Wisconsin
Republican Party members of the Wisconsin State Assembly
21st-century American politicians
Businesspeople from Wisconsin
University of Wisconsin–Green Bay alumni
Walden University alumni